L.D.K. Lounge Designers Killer is the sixth album by the Japanese electronica band Capsule. It was released in 2005 and peaked at No. 49 on the Oricon weekly charts.

A remastered version of the album was released in 2022.

"Do Do Pi Do" was covered by Kyary Pamyu Pamyu on her 2014 studio album Pika Pika Fantajin.

Track list 

Capsule (band) albums
2005 albums
Albums produced by Yasutaka Nakata